The 12091 / 12092 Kathgodam–Dehradun Naini Doon Jan Shatabdi Express is a Superfast Express train of the Jan Shatabdi Express series belonging to Indian Railways – North Eastern Railway zone that runs between  and  in India.

It operates as train number 12092 from Kathgodam to Dehradun and as train number 12091 in the reverse direction, serving the states of Uttar Pradesh and Uttarakhand.

It is among the latest trains introduced in the Jan Shatabdi Express series which were originally started by the then railway minister of India Mr. Nitish Kumar during the 2002–03 railway budget

Coaches

The 12092 / 91 Kathgodam–Dehradun Naini Doon Jan Shatabdi Express has 2 AC Chair Car, 5 2nd Class seating, 3 Unreserved/General and 2 Seating cum Luggage Rake coaches. It does not carry a pantry car.

As is customary with most train services in India, coach composition may be amended at the discretion of Indian Railways depending on demand.

Service

Despite the average speed of the train being below , as per Indian Railways rules, its fare includes a Superfast surcharge.

Routeing

Traction

As the route is fully electrified,  Ghaziabad-based WAP-5 / WAP-7(HOG Equipped) locomotive powers the train for its entire journey.

Operation

The 12091 / 12092 Kathgodam–Dehradun Naini Doon Jan Shatabdi Express runs 5 days a week (except Thursday & Sunday) .

References 

 http://pib.nic.in/newsite/PrintRelease.aspx?relid=183062
 https://www.facebook.com/NRlyIndia/posts/a-new-janshatabdi-express-train-between-kathgodam-and-dehradun1209212091-naini-d/2187276821517205/

External links

https://www.facebook.com/NRlyIndia/posts/a-new-janshatabdi-express-train-between-kathgodam-and-dehradun1209212091-naini-d/2187276821517205/
http://www.uniindia.com/piyush-goyal-flags-off-naini-doon-janshatabdi-express/india/news/1330520.html
https://timesofindia.indiatimes.com/city/dehradun/change-timings-of-naini-doon-janshatabdi-says-hc-after-plea-highlights-odd-hours/articleshow/65614172.cms
https://ner.indianrailways.gov.in/view_detail.jsp?lang=0&id=0,4,268&dcd=2278&did=154416138226652644D5AFE9BFDA7444A4CC6ABC402C5
https://ner.indianrailways.gov.in/view_detail.jsp?lang=0&id=0,4,268&dcd=1570&did=1535088435578175186C106CDD660095EC76144826436
http://www.indianrailways.gov.in/railwayboard/uploads/directorate/finance_budget/Previous%20Budget%20Speeches/2002-03.pdf
http://pib.nic.in/newsite/PrintRelease.aspx?relid=183062
https://erail.in/train-enquiry/12092
https://erail.in/train-enquiry/12091
https://indiarailinfo.com/train/gallery/87941?

Jan Shatabdi Express trains
Rail transport in Uttarakhand
Rail transport in Uttar Pradesh